Albela may refer to:

 Albela (1951 film), a Hindi film acted and directed by Bhagwan Dada 
 Albela (1971 film), a Hindi film directed by A. Shamsheer and starring Mehmood and Aruna Irani
 Albela (1986 film), a Hindi film of 1986
 Albela (2001 film), a Hindi film directed by Deepak Sareen and starring Govinda and Aishwarya Rai
 Albela (actor) (1940–2004), Pakistani actor and comedian

See also
 Albeli (disambiguation)